Andrejs Vlaščenko (born 15 June 1974) is a figure skater who represented Latvia (1992–94) and Germany (1994–04). Competing for Germany, he won two Grand Prix medals – bronze at both the 2001 Trophee Lalique and at the 1998 Sparkassen Cup on Ice – and became a four-time German national champion. In 1998, he placed fourth at the European Championships in Milan and fifth at the World Championships in Minneapolis.

Personal life 
Vlaščenko was born on 15 June 1974 in Weimar, East Germany while his father was stationed there in the Soviet army. His family later returned to the Soviet Union and he grew up in Latvia. He moved to Germany in 1994.

Career

Early career 
Vlaščenko began skating in 1980. Representing Latvia, he finished 8th at the 1993 World Junior Championships, held in December 1992 in Seoul, South Korea.

In February 1994, Vlaščenko appeared at the Winter Olympics in Lillehammer, Norway, placing 21st in the short program, 20th in the free skate, and 21st overall. His last competition for Latvia was the World Championships in March 1994 in Chiba, Japan; he ranked 5th in his qualifying group, 11th in the short, 10th in the free, and 11th overall. He was coached by Anta Medne and Andžela Šurupova.

Move to Germany 
Vlascenko decided to skate for Germany after moving there in 1994. He initially represented EV Füssen.

In the 1995–96 season, he began appearing in the newly created ISU Champions Series (later known as the Grand Prix series) and won his second consecutive German national title. He was sent to the 1996 European Championships in Sofia, Bulgaria, but withdrew after placing first in his qualifying group. At the 1996 World Championships in Edmonton, Alberta, Canada, he ranked fourth in his qualifying group, 11th in the short program, eighth in the free skate, and eighth overall. The following season, he finished sixth at the 1997 European Championships in Paris after placing third in the short and sixth in the free. He had the same final result at the 1997 World Championships in Lausanne after placing fourth in qualifying, 10th in the short, and 5th in the free.

In the 1997–98 season, Vlascenko finished second to Sven Meyer at the German Championships but went on to achieve his best ISU Championship results. Ranked fourth in the short and fifth in the free, he finished fourth overall at the European Championships in January 1998 in Milan, Italy. In April, he finished fifth at the 1998 World Championships in Minneapolis, USA (7th in qualifying, 6th in the short, and 5th in the free).

In November 1998, Vlascenko won his first Grand Prix medal, bronze at the Sparkassen Cup on Ice. After placing 6th at the 1998 Trophée Lalique and 4th at the 1998 NHK Trophy, he qualified for the Grand Prix Final and went on to win his fourth German national title. In January 1999, he placed fourth (second in his qualifying group, sixth in the short, and fourth in the free) at the European Championships in Prague, Czech Republic. In March, he placed sixth at the Grand Prix Final in Saint Petersburg, Russia, and then 9th at the 1999 World Championships in Helsinki, Finland.

Vlascenko was 7th at the 2000 European Championships in Vienna, Austria, and 16th at the 1999 World Championships in Nice, France. He changed coaches in the summer of 2000, leaving Surupova to join Steffie Ruttkies in Munich. He placed 6th at the 2001 European Championships in Bratislava, Slovakia.

In the 2001–02 season, Vlascenko began representing Münchner Eislaufverein and continued with Ruttkies as his coach. After winning his second Grand Prix medal, bronze at the 2001 Trophée Lalique, he finished 8th at the 2002 European Championships in Lausanne, Switzerland, and 10th at the 2002 World Championships in Nagano, Japan.

Alexander Vedenin became his coach, working with him in Munich, in the 2002–03 season. Vlascenko took bronze at the German Championships and finished 17th at the 2003 World Championships in Washington, D.C. after placing 11th in qualifying, 21st in the short, and 12th in the free. Vedenin remained his coach the following season. Vlascenko ended his career in February 2004 at the European Championships in Budapest, where he placed 7th.

Programs

Results

For Latvia

For Germany

References

External links
 
 
 
 

1974 births
Living people
Soviet male single skaters
Latvian male single skaters
German male single skaters
Figure skaters at the 1994 Winter Olympics
Olympic figure skaters of Latvia
Sportspeople from Weimar
German people of Latvian descent